DM, Dm, dm, or D.M. may stand for:

Academic titles and postnominals
 Dame of the Sovereign Military Order of Malta, a chivalric order
 Doctor of Management, an academic management degree
 Doctor of Medicine, an academic medical degree 
 Doctor of Music, an academic music-performance degree, also known as D.M.A
 Doctor of Metaphysics, an academic degree in metaphysics

Arts, entertainment, and media

Broadcasting
 Danger Mouse (TV series), a British animated television series
 WWDM, a radio station licensed to Sumter, South Carolina, United States

Gaming
 Deathmatch, a gameplay mode integrated into first-person shooter computer games
 Dungeon Master, the game designer, storyteller and referee in Dungeons & Dragons

Music
 DM (album), 2017, by Mexican singer Dulce María
 "DM" (song), 2022, by Fromis 9
 D minor, a minor scale or chord on the musical note D
 Dance marathon, a multiple-day charity event on U.S. college campuses
 Death metal, a musical style evolving from thrash metal
 Depeche Mode, an English synthpop band formed in 1980
 Drum major, the leader of a marching band

News media
 Daily Mail, a right-wing British newspaper and news website
 Daily Mirror, a left-wing British newspaper

Social media
 Digital marketing
 Digital media
 Private message (also direct message or dm)

In business and economics
 Deutsche Mark (1948–2002), the former currency of Germany (and West Germany)
 East German mark (1951–1990)
 Developed market, those countries that are thought to be the most developed
 Direct mail, or advertising mail, delivery of advertising material to recipients of postal mail
 Direct market, the dominant distribution and retail network for North American comic books
 Direct marketing, a type of marketing sending messages directly to consumers

Companies and products
 Daily Mail and General Trust, a British newspaper and magazine group
 Detroit and Mackinac Railway
 Digital Monolithic, a National Semiconductor prefix for their digital logic integrated circuits
 dm-drogerie markt, a German drugstore chain
 Dr. Martens, a brand of boots
 Maersk Air (IATA code DM), a former Danish airline which operated from 1969 until 2005

Military
 DM, a US Navy abbreviation for "light minelayer"
 Designated marksman, a soldier fulfilling the marksman role in an infantry squad
 Royal Naval Armaments Depot, Defense Munitions, sites are prefixed DM

Places
 Davis–Monthan Air Force Base, Tucson, Arizona, US
 Des Moines, Iowa, the state capital
 Dominica, an island nation in the Caribbean Sea (ISO 3166-1 alpha-2 code: DM)

Science, technology, and mathematics

Computing
 .dm, Dominica's top-level Internet domain
 Data mart, a specialized version of a data warehouse
 Data migration, transferring data from one computer storage system to another
 Data mining, searching large volumes of data for patterns
 Digital Monolithic, a National Semiconductor prefix for their digital logic integrated circuits
 Dimensional modeling, a set of techniques and concepts used in data warehouse design

Software
 Display Manager, a window system for Domain/OS on Apollo/Domain workstations
 Device management, programs for automatically updating the software on mobile phone
 Device mapper, a component of the Linux kernel that supports logical volume management
 X display manager, a graphical login manager

Medicine
 Degenerative myelopathy, a condition in dogs affecting the spinal cord
 Dextromethorphan, an anti-coughing drug found in many preparations
 Diabetes mellitus, a disease characterized by high blood sugar
 Difference due to memory, a neural activity effect
 Double minute, fragments of extrachromosomal DNA in human tumors
 Myotonic dystrophy (DM-1/2/3), a chronic muscle-wasting disease
 n-Decyl β-D-Maltopyranoside, a maltoside detergent used when purifying membrane proteins
 Dermatomyositis, an inflammatory systemic disorder affecting the skin, muscles, and other organs

Physics
 Dark matter, in cosmology, hypothetical non-luminous matter
 Deformable mirror
 Dichroic mirror, a mirror with different transmittance or reflectance at two different wavelengths
 Dispersion measure, the amount of dispersion of radio waves by interstellar medium
 Dry matter, a measurement of the mass of something when completely dried

Units of length
 Decimetre (dm), equal to ten centimetres
 Decametre (sometimes Dm), equal to ten metres
 Data mile (DM), in radar, equal to 6000 feet

Other uses in science, technology and mathematics
 Adamsite, a chemical agent used in riot control
 Deformable mirror (DM), a means of correcting aberrations in photonics applications
 Demineralisation (disambiguation), various processes affecting bones, teeth, soil, cocoons, and water
 Cantor's diagonal argument or method, a mathematical proof of the uncountability of real numbers
 Differential Manchester encoding
 Dipole moment (disambiguation), the measure of polarity of a system of charges
 Distributed morphology, a theoretical framework in linguistics

Sports and recreation
 Defensive midfielder, an association football position
 Divemaster, in scuba diving
 Dungeon monitor, a safety role in BDSM

Other uses
 De minimis, a Latin legal term
 Diis Manibus, a Latin epitaphial acronym 
 SJ Dm3, and Dm, Swedish locomotives
 District magistrate, senior local role in the Indian Administrative Service

See also
 DMS (disambiguation)
 MD (disambiguation)